Stefano Sacchetti (born 10 August 1972) is a retired Italian football defender.

References

1972 births
Living people
Italian footballers
Modena F.C. players
Piacenza Calcio 1919 players
U.C. Sampdoria players
Mantova 1911 players
Association football defenders
Serie A players